Kog is a village in the hills northeast of Ormož in northeastern Slovenia, right on the border with Croatia. The area traditionally belonged to the Styria region and is now included in the Drava Statistical Region.

The parish church in the village is dedicated to Saint Wolfgang and belongs to the Roman Catholic Archdiocese of Maribor. The church was built in 1688, but greatly damaged in the Second World War and rebuilt in the second half of the 20th century.

The village was unofficially known as Sveti Bolfenk pri Središču in the past.

References

External links
Kog on Geopedia

Populated places in the Municipality of Ormož